Black Lagoon (stylized in all caps) is a Japanese manga series written and illustrated by Rei Hiroe. It has been published in Shogakukan's seinen manga magazine Monthly Sunday Gene-X since April 2002, with its chapters collected in 12 tankōbon volumes as of August 2021. In North America, the manga is licensed for English release by Viz Media.

The series follows the Lagoon Company, a four-member team of pirate mercenaries smuggling goods in and around the seas of Southeast Asia with their PT boat, the Black Lagoon. The group takes on various jobs, usually involving criminal organizations and resulting in violent gunfights.

The manga was adapted into an anime television series by Madhouse, which was broadcast for two seasons of 12 episodes each in 2006, followed by a five-episode original video animation (OVA) series released from July 2010 to June 2011.

By January 2022, the Black Lagoon manga had over 8.5 million copies in circulation. The series has been overall well received, with critics particularly praising the action sequences.

Plot
A team of pirate mercenaries known as the Lagoon Company, that smuggles goods in and around the seas of Southeast Asia in the early to mid 1990s. The Lagoon Company consists of four members: Dutch, the leader; Revy, the main gunfighter; Benny, the mechanic, computer specialist, and researcher; and Rock, an ex-salaryman hijacked by the team and abandoned by his department chief, eventually becoming their negotiator and "professional" face of the group, retaining his old job skills.

Their base of operations is located in the fictional harbor city of Roanapur in east Thailand near the border of Cambodia (somewhere in the Amphoe Mueang Trat district, likely on the mainland north/northeast of the Ko Chang island or on the island itself). The city is home to the Japanese yakuza, the Chinese triad, the Russian Bratva, the Colombian cartel, the Italian mafia, a wide assortment of pickpockets, thugs, mercenaries, thieves, prostitutes, assassins, and gunmen. The city also has a large Vietnamese refugee population following the Vietnamese refugees exodus after the communist takeover of Vietnam in 1975.

Lagoon Company transports goods for various clients in the American made  Elco-type PT boat, Black Lagoon. It has a particularly friendly relationship with the Russian crime syndicate Hotel Moscow. The team takes on a variety of missions—which may involve violent firefights, hand-to-hand combat, and nautical battles—in various Southeast Asian locations, even going as far as Phu Quoc island of Vietnam. When they are not working, the members of the Lagoon Company spend much of their down time at The Yellow Flag, a bar in Roanapur which is often destroyed in firefights.

Production

Concept and influences
Manga author Rei Hiroe said that when he was approached by the publisher Shogakukan to work for a manga project, he offered them different prototype stories that he had planned, including Black Lagoon, which was finally selected. Hiroe wanted to create an action and crime oriented series. For the basis of the story, he was inspired by watching news about piracy cases in the South China Sea in the 1990s, which he thought that fitted perfectly with his desire to make a "dynamic and original" series, adding that pirates "know no borders and are truly free," and that it seemed interesting to work on the subject. Hiroe also commented that at first, the original idea was about medieval pirates, but he changed his mind and made the story about modern day pirates instead.

Hiroe stated that he has been influenced by writers James Ellroy, whom he called his favorite novelist, and Stephen King, stating that he learned how to create the atmosphere of Black Lagoon based on his works. Hiroe also called 's manga series Wild 7 "almost like the DNA of that sort of action genre," and mentioned influence from Akihiro Ito (Geobreeders author) and Kenichi Sonoda (Gunsmith Cats author). Apart from manga, Hiroe stated that, from a "purely graphic point of view", he was influenced by the Franco-Belgian comic series Soda, and commented that he liked the atmosphere and storytelling of Blacksad by Spanish authors Juan Díaz Canales and Juanjo Guarnido.

Hiroe is particularly influenced by films, mentioning influence from directors John Woo, Quentin Tarantino, Robert Rodriguez, and by the 1990s Hollywood films and triad Hong Kong films from the 1980s and 1990s. Hiroe mentioned that Pulp Fiction and other films from Tarantino inspired him to balance the action and comedy in Black Lagoon.

Hiroe said that although the series is much influenced by American works, he was not worried about the references being lost on the Japanese readers, stating that it can be sensed when the American culture is coming from a Japanese person, so "there's a style in it that can be sensed by Japanese readers," adding that conversely, if people in America read it, there is "more potential for awkwardness and weird parts."

Writing and development
Regarding accuracy, Hiroe declared that he had not done too much research on modern day pirates, commenting that even on the internet is difficult to find good information on them, also stating that the crew of Black Lagoon is "a bit different from what we are used to seeing." Regarding the weapons, on the other hand, Hiroe said that he was a big fan and that he had a personal collection, being well-versed on the subject, adding that he bought encyclopedias in order to benefit from more precise details. Due to the fact that the series is a "period piece of sorts," which features mafia and military themes, Hiroe commented that he did a lot of research for those subjects, watching documentaries and reading books. Hiroe also stated that he would sometimes find some interesting facts that he would like to incorporate into his work, and that he tried not to go towards current events, but use past information for the entertainment value. He said that the setting is loosely based on reality and that it would not be interesting if it were unrealistic, adding that he at least wants to maintain a semblance of realism, emphasizing, however, that the sense of realism is "very subjective," adding that a character like Roberta, a "Terminator-like maid," would not work in a novel, but she will in a comic; "she has to be over-the-top because it's a comic."

Hiroe commented that while film is an "active" medium, manga is like having "still frames", so for the action scenes he needs to find the "best moments in time to convey meaning and movement," adding that one of the advantages of manga is that "you're not anchored to reality", commenting that he is able to make guns bigger than their physical counterparts and make explosions "far larger and more gaudy." He said that from the start, it was agreed with the publisher that the series would include action and violence, so there were never issues regarding that, adding that he would "go towards even more sensationalism if it is necessary for the plot," but Hiroe added as well that he does not want it to be confined to its violence either.

Hiroe said that from the start, he wanted a story "without nationalities, without specific identities," adding that "we are still in a criminal context," and by mixing different cultures in the story, he wanted to see the reaction of each culture to this "thorny subject," without making any judgment. Referring to whether the manga could be perceived as a political statement, due to actual piracy issues in Africa and elsewhere, and since the manga is about pirates, Hiroe said that "as long as there are various people's opinions being voiced, it won't cease to be political," emphasizing, however, that there is not just one possible way of reading it, such as "America is bad" or "Russia is bad," and that the series is written to be perceived from different perspectives. Although Hiroe noted that his series is entertainment, he commented that he would like to make people who read it feel the backdrops, like characters with poverty backgrounds or living in the world with international conflicts. Hiroe also said that it is fine if the readers only enjoy the series purely for the action, but commented: "[t]here are a few things hidden in there, so I'd be the happiest if on a second or third read-through, those things become apparent."

Hiroe said that generally it takes him about a month to produce one chapter, adding that there are a lot of details and he puts a lot of work into it. Regarding the process, Hiroe explained that he has the initial thought, then the publisher would give him input as to "what’s good and what’s bad and what’s good for the audience, what they might like." They discuss it and if something might not work so well, he redoes the plot line. Hiroe commented that while there are a lot of manga artists who do not have good relationship with the publishing company, and they have to do what they are ordered, in his case, it is more mutual and he can do more of what he likes at the same time. Hiroe's editor, Akinobu Natsume, commented that at first, the story was very simple, but that after having introduced more characters, they had to think about their respective stories, as well as the relationships that unite them, commenting that this was in line with the complexity that Hiroe wanted, supporting him and refraining him when the story got too difficult to follow. Hiroe declared that there are no real rules for the variable duration of the story arcs, and that he tries above all to think about the appropriate length to stage all that he had to say on the initial idea, adding that the rest of the story should stay in that direction. He said that since the series is set in the 20th century, he counts on the occasion of the transition to the 21st century to create a "powerful event" that will alter its plot, commenting that if he manages to transcribe his ideas properly, "we will reach the culmination of my story." He affirmed that the had in mind the end of the story and that he knew the conclusion that he needs to make for each character, but that it must be staged in the right direction and in a consistent way.

Hiroe said that to keep the manga interesting and exciting for both himself and the readers, he "takes a rest right in the middle. Just stop, take a step back, and relax for a bit so I’m not stuck in the grind," commenting that manga artists who write weekly manga or other long-running series, like those published in Weekly Shōnen Jump, "don’t have that luxury," and that working on a monthly series gives him the opportunity to work on a different project "to keep things from getting stale." The manga has been on hiatus several times; it went for an almost three-year hiatus from May 19, 2010, to January 19, 2013; it went on a three-year hiatus again from January 18, 2014, to May 19, 2017; it went on hiatus for a year from August 18, 2018, to September 19, 2019. Hiroe has attributed these pauses to his depression, adding that he is doing his best to move forward with the series without rushing too much.

Characters

Referring to the creation of the characters, Hiroe stated that he goes backward, imagining how they would think and how they lived, commenting that the process in itself "can be fun." He commented: "I sometimes first decide that this guy is from here, he's ethnically this way, he belongs to this kind of group, then look into historical facts and events. From there I try to tie all threads of those elements together, and when they can be tied organically together it's like, "Yay this is fun!" Hiroe said that the characters are not necessarily based on anyone in particular, but that from watching films in particular, he would arrange things which would "kind of shape the character." He commented, however, that Mr. Chang, the leader of the triads, has a resemblance to Hong Kong actor Chow Yun-fat. Hiroe claimed that the fact that in the story are women who take up arms, while men have more sedate roles, was not a well-considered choice at the start, but that it naturally "imposed itself over the course of the adventure," noting that this is one of its strong points, expressing happiness to have met women who have enjoyed the series.

Regarding Revy, Hiroe said that he had no particular model in mind, but commented that after watching Robert Rodriguez's film From Dusk till Dawn, he noticed the "imposing tattoo" on the shoulder of George Clooney's character and thought that it "would be nice" to do such a tattoo on a female body. For her personality, Hiroe first wanted that her dominant character trait was impulsiveness. To accentuate it, he decided to make her grow up in a criminal environment, so that her values were totally different from "ordinary mortals." Hiroe commented that she is a strong woman, good at shooting guns and fighting, but that she is not motivated by justice and that she is just an "ordinary criminal," adding that he placed her in the story because "it is rare to see such a female" and her presence would make it more interesting. Hiroe commented that the reason behind her Chinese-American heritage was because he wanted to make her a minority, adding that she does not look Caucasoid but rather Mongoloid, and that it would make it easier for Japanese readers to identify with her; "easier than if it was a white woman going ballistic." He added that it is interesting when there is a gap between the way she looks and her way of thinking, commenting that people like that "aren't really tied down to a region, like they're rootless wanderers," and that "obviously, she probably faces discrimination in her life," adding that taking all that into account, he thought the character would "stand out more." Hiroe said that Revy is the character that requires most work from a graphic point of view, expressing that he had drawn her countless of times in very different situations and emotions, and that he must be careful to not go in another direction over time, so as to not distort the initial character. 

According to Hiroe, at the beginning of the project there were only "bad men," and after discussing it with the editorial staff, they decided to introduce a character who would share the same point of view as the readers, so he added Rock as a businessman to the story. Hiroe commented that there was no particular reason why he is Japanese. Hiroe commented that after Rock was added to the story, "he came to life and started to build his own interesting character." Sunao Katabuchi, director of the anime adaptation, said that Rock is the character that he empathized more with, commenting that while "[w]e live our daily lives as if we are closed inside of a box-like world," Rock "breaks out of such a box," adding that breaking out is not the end for him; "[he senses that] there may yet another box that maybe be broken out of," and he is "pointed in the right direction. The fight is not with the container which encloses the world, but with one's self." 

Hiroe stated that he did not dislike "cute girls" or moe characters, but that the inclusion of these characters should depend on whether there is a relevancy to use them in what he is creating. He stated that when creating the Colombian maid and former FARC guerrilla, Roberta, her design was slightly influenced from the growing interest in maids at the time, but that he dressed her as such because he imagined that an affluent family in South America "would dress maids that way," adding that her design was not a take on "moe culture" as much as it made contextual sense. Katabuchi commented that the anime staff referred to the scene where Roberta's umbrella opens up and spins around the body and fires as "The Evil Mary Poppins", adding that Hiroe also had the idea to use the character as a kind of "Death Poppins." Hiroe commented that at the beginning, Roberta had "a very set character background," but he wanted to see if he could go past that and break it down to see what he could do with it, which is why the character reappeared in the story.

Originally, he had not planned the arc of the Hansel and Gretel twins to be more dark and serious than the rest of the series. He commented that at first he thought that it would be great if there were cute "really loopy" twin kids wielding giant guns, but that he started doing some research, reading about the history of Romania (their home country) and the Cold War/Soviet era, commenting: "[t]hings were really bad back then, so the story became much darker based on what I'd learned. It was…not exactly the happiest place on Earth."

Media

Manga

Written and illustrated by Rei Hiroe, the pilot chapter of Black Lagoon was published in Shogakukan's seinen manga magazine Monthly Sunday Gene-X on March 19, 2001. It started its serialization in the same magazine on April 19, 2002. Shogakukan has collected its chapters into individual tankōbon volumes. The first volume was released on December 12, 2002. As of August 19, 2021, twelve volumes have been released.

In North America, the manga is licensed for English release by Viz Media. The first volume was released on August 12, 2008. As of January 21, 2020, eleven volumes have been released. Due to copyright-related reasons, the Viz Media edition censors the references to song lyrics and brand names, including the brands of the guns.

A spin-off about Sawyer, titled , illustrated by Tatsuhiko Ida, began in Monthly Sunday Gene-X on September 19, 2019. The first tankōbon volume was released on July 17, 2020. As of September 16, 2022, five volumes have been released.

A spin-off about Eda, titled Black Lagoon Eda -Initial Stage-, illustrated by Hajime Yamamura, started in Monthly Sunday Gene-X on April 19, 2022. The first tankōbon volume was released on September 16, 2022.

Anime

The manga was adapted into an anime television series animated by Madhouse, which was broadcast for twelve episodes on Chiba TV (and on other fifteen terrestrial stations) from April 9 to June 25, 2006. 

A second season, Black Lagoon: The Second Barrage, consisting of twelve more episodes, ran for the first time on Sendai Television from October 3 to December 19, 2006.

A five-episode original video animation (OVA), titled Black Lagoon: Roberta's Blood Trail, which covered the "El Baile de la Muerte" arc of the manga, was released from July 17, 2010, to June 22, 2011.

Other media
Two light novels written by Gen Urobuchi, with illustrations by Hiroe, have been released under Shogakukan's Gagaga Bunko imprint.  was published on July 18, 2008.  was published on January 18, 2011.

An illustration book, titled Onslaught: Black Lagoon Illustrations, was released by Shogakukan on August 19, 2021. It includes the original pilot chapter illustrated pages, key visuals of the 20th anniversary exhibition and unpublished illustrations. The limited edition included a water gun replica of Revy's Beretta 92 FS "Sword Cutlass Special", five autographed illustrations and six bookmarks.

Reception
The volumes of Black Lagoon have frequently ranked as the best-selling manga volumes on Japan's weekly charts since 2007. The 8th volume was the #14 best-selling manga volume of 2008 in Japan. By February 2014, the manga had over 6 million copies in circulation; over 7 million copies in circulation by November 2018; and over 8.5 million copies in circulation by January 2022.

About.com's Deb Aoki listed Viz Media's English release of Black Lagoon as the best new seinen manga of 2008, along with Gantz. Aoki said that even non-manga readers would enjoy it, adding that it is "more like a Hollywood or Hong Kong action flick" than a series with the "pubescent girls and giant robots" formula usually associated with manga, also calling it "a fun fantasy for readers who've outgrown the high seas hi-jinks of One Piece but are still pirates at heart." Aoki added that the focus on "whip-smart, sexy and confident women" is one of the best things of the series; "[n]ot girls, but real women who can blow up enemies without blinking an eye or breaking a nail." Leroy Douresseaux of ComicBookBin compared it to The A-Team and to a "Quentin Tarantino exploitation flick," also calling it an "extra-violent version of Cowboy Bebop" and "Bad Boys II on paper," stating that the series "will appeal to any male reader old enough to understand big guns, big boobs, and gratuitous pistol-in-crotch shots." 

Greg McElhatton of Read About Comics said that the series is "never boring, never wasting time for anything," adding that it is not "all action and nothing else," lauding the way Hiroe was able to bring across Revy's existentialist views of the world "without sounding preachy or bringing the story to a crashing halt," mentioning her disagreements with Rock. McElhatton said that the series is "clever, fast, and fun" and that "isn't a simple shoot-em-up, it's an action comic for people who appreciate a smart script." A.E. Sparrow of IGN made a positive review of the series, stating that it has "[e]verything you love about a bad action movie," but stating that unlike a "bad action movie", the series has "actual character development", commenting that it "veers towards that dynamic that made Cowboy Bebop as fun as it was." Isaac Hale of PopCultureShock said that the series reminded him "intensely" of Kouta Hirano's Hellsing, stating that both series feature "psychotic badasses", "they're all about the fanservice" and they both "shamelessly fetishize violence." Hale also said that the action is "insane, impossible, and drips with overwhelming amounts of cool," praising its artwork as well. 

Davey C. Jones of Active Anime praised the series for its action scenes and artwork, stating: "[t]he character designs are grade A. The guns, torpedoes, boats, ships, cars, are all detailed to spec and look fantastic!" recommending as well the series to fans of Gunsmith Cats and Cowboy Bebop. Greg Hackmann of Mania.com wrote that Hiroe "doesn't saddle the over-the-top action with scenes of lingering seriousness or angst," noting that the point of the story is "watch our anti-heroes work together […] to rack up ridiculous body counts and generally kick serious amounts of ass. And you know what? It may sound dumb -- hell, it is dumb -- but it's also incredibly damned entertaining." David Rasmussen of Manga Life compared the series unfavorably to Cowboy Bebop, stating that while it "doesn't suck," it is not "Cowboy Bebop memorable either." Rasmussen called it a "decent enough action drama yarn," but commented: "I never really connected with its characters to the point of saying I really want to rave about this."

Writer Jason Thompson called the series "a high-energy heist manga intended, if the author's in-jokes are any indication, in the collateral-damage spirit of movies like Rambo and The Wild Bunch." Thompson said that the dialogues are well-written and "Tarantino-ishly foul-mouthed," adding that the action scenes are "more flashy than clear," criticizing the "huge sound effects and closeups of muzzle blasts," which make it "difficult to tell what's happening," but ultimately called the series "a fun ride, and at its best moments it reaches an almost Hellsing-like level of mayhem." Writing for Anime News Network (ANN), Thompson stated that the series has superficial similarities to Gunsmith Cats, including "strong female protagonists, crime/heist stories, and tons of guns," but stated that Hiroe's art style is more similar to the art of Akihiro Ito and Kouta Hirano, commenting, however, that the series does not "feel particularly influenced by manga," but "influenced by everything imaginable and wants to let you know it," mentioning its references from John Woo, The Magnificent Seven to Jean-Paul Sartre. Thompson called it "a truly "global manga," with international influences and an international cast, a rainbow of colors." 

Theron Martin of ANN commented that the series "should suit any fan of R-rated Hollywood action movies just fine," also praising the artwork and the action scenes, concluding: "Black Lagoon offers a healthy, high-octane serving of nearly non-stop violence, scheming, and graphic content. It aspires to be nothing more than a hard-core actioner, and because of that it works extremely well." Reviewing the first volume, Carlo Santos, of the same website, said that it is "the very definition of cinematic: gunplay techniques by John Woo, explosions by Michael Bay, and a host of other visual indulgences that make it a loud, nonstop blockbuster." Santos, however, stated that the story "ripped straight from the plotbook for crime dramas and gang wars," adding that each chapter is paced according to formula, concluding that the series is "[n]ot the greatest, not the deepest, but entertaining enough if you're up for some babes with guns." Reviewing the tenth volume, Rebecca Silverman, of the same website, noted that while the series has physical fanservice, most of it is gun related, "with shots of different firearms and gun battles that rely on difficult angles," commenting that the series' appeal is its "dark, criminal fantasy about a world with few rules, where death is ready to take you the minute you start to think about giving up."

Notes

References

Further reading

External links

  
  
 

Black Lagoon
2002 manga
2008 Japanese novels
Anime series based on manga
Dark comedy anime and manga
Fiction set in the 1990s
Gagaga Bunko
Girls with guns anime and manga
Light novels
Manga adapted into television series
Organized crime in anime and manga
Pirates in anime and manga
Seinen manga
Shogakukan franchises
Shogakukan manga
Terrorism in fiction
Thailand in fiction
Thriller anime and manga
Triad (organized crime)
Viz Media manga
Works about Colombian drug cartels
Works about the Russian Mafia
Yakuza in anime and manga